Haitian Vodou is a syncretic mixture of Roman Catholic rituals developed during the French colonial period, based on traditional African beliefs, with roots in Dahomey, Kongo and Yoruba traditions, and folkloric influence from the indigenous Taino peoples of Haiti. The lwa, or spirits with whom Vodou adherants work and practice, are not gods but servants of the Supreme Creator Bondye (pronounced Bon Dieu). In keeping with the French-Catholic influence of the faith, Vodou practioneers are for the most part monotheists, believing that the lwa are great and powerful forces in the world with whom humans interact and vice versa, resulting in a symbiotic relationship intended to bring both humans and the lwa back to Bondye. "Vodou is a religious practice, a faith that points toward an intimate knowledge of God, and offers its practitioners a means to come into communion with the Divine, through an ever evolving paradigm of dance, song and prayers."

History and origins of Voodooism in Haiti 

Vodou originated from the Animist beliefs of the Yoruba tribes in Benin.

There are in total 180 lwa in the Vodou religion, each of them carrying a name and, a specific and exclusive function. For instance, Gede are the spirit of life and death who is assigned to separate the souls and bodies of people when the time comes and also to watch over their graveyards.

Related notions
 Asagwe - Haitian Vodou dancing used to honor the Loa.
 Avalou - ("supplication") Haitian Vodou dance.
 Coco macaque - Haitian Vodou implement. It is a stick, which is supposed to be able to walk on its own. The owner of a coco macaque can send it on errands. If it is used to hit an enemy, the enemy will die before the dawn.
 Gangan, Houngan - Haitian priests. They lead the peoples in dancing, drumming, and singing to invoke the Loa.
 Gede - family of spirits related to death and fertility.
 Guinee - Haitian afterlife. It is also where life began and the home of their spirits.
 Lwa - Haitian Vodou spirit.
 Mambo - Haitian priestess who, together with the Houngan, leads the Vodou rituals and invokes the Loa.
 Paquet congo - charms made of organic matter wrapped in cloth, intended to rouse the Loa.
 Petro - aggressive and warlike family of spirits
 Rada - old, benefic family of spirits
 Tonton Macoute, a Haitian mythological phrase meaning "bogey man" (literally: "Uncle Bagman")
 Ville au Camp - ("House in the Fields") the underwater capital of the Loa.

See also 
 Haitian Vodou
 Culture of Haiti
 Religion in Haiti
 Haitian art
 Veve, a religious symbol commonly used in Vodou and Palo

References

External links
List of Vodou Loa

 
Haitian culture
Caribbean mythology
Haitian Vodou
Religion in Haiti